The national symbols of Lebanon are official and unofficial flags, icons or cultural expressions that are emblematic, representative or otherwise characteristic of Lebanon and of its culture.

Symbol

References 

National symbols of Lebanon
Lebanon
National symbols